Sortilege may refer to:

 Cleromancy, a method of divination by casting lots 
 Sortes (ancient Rome)
 Sortilège, a liqueur made from Canadian whisky and maple syrup
 Sortilège (band), a French heavy metal band
 Sortilège (EP), 1983

See also
 L'enfant et les sortilèges, a 1925 opera by Maurice Ravel with libretto by Colette
 Sortilèges, a 1945 French film directed by Christian-Jaque
 Sortilegio, a Mexican telenovela produced by Carla Estrada for Televisa in 2009
 Sorcery (disambiguation)